Bernard Vaughan was a British actor of the silent era.

Selected filmography
 The Valley of Fear (1916)
 The Second Mrs. Tanqueray (1916)
 Nursie! Nursie! (1916)
 Rock of Ages (1918)
 Linked by Fate (1919)
 Lady Tetley's Decree (1920)
 The Alley of Golden Hearts (1924)
 God's Clay (1928)

References

External links

Year of birth unknown
Year of death unknown
British male silent film actors
20th-century British male actors